Løfsgaard is a Norwegian surname. Notable people with the surname include:

Arne Løfsgaard (1887–1974), Norwegian politician
Jostein Løfsgaard (1923–2011), Norwegian academic administrator

Norwegian-language surnames